Tirreno–Adriatico, nicknamed the "Race of the Two Seas", is an elite road cycling stage race in Italy, run between the Tyrrhenian and Adriatic coasts. Traditionally held in the early part of the season, it is considered to be an important preparation for the Giro d'Italia. It is part of the UCI World Tour, cycling's highest level of professional men's races.

First held in 1966, the race was held over three stages. Since 2002 it is held over seven stages. Except for the first edition, the last stage has always finished in San Benedetto del Tronto on the Adriatic Seaside. Belgian Roger De Vlaeminck holds the record for most wins with six consecutive victories in the 1970s. Italian Francesco Moser also finished six times on the podium and won the race twice.

History
The Tirreno–Adriatico was created in 1966 by the Lazio-based cycling club Forze Sportive Romane. As all the illustrious Italian cycling races were held in Northern Italy, the race was named "Tre Giorni del Sud" (English: Three days of the South). The first edition was a three-day race, starting on 11 March 1966 in Rome and finishing two days later in Pescara. Dino Zandegù won the inaugural edition. In 1967 the second edition was run over five stages, won by Franco Bitossi.

In the 1970s the young race manifested itself as an ideal preparation race for the monument classic Milan–San Remo which was run one week later. Belgian classics specialist Roger De Vlaeminck monopolized the race with six consecutive wins. After De Vlaeminck's reign, the race was the scene of the rivalry between Italian cycling icons Giuseppe Saronni and Francesco Moser, each winning the event twice.

From 1984 to 2001 the race grew to an event raced over six to eight stages and the location shifted more towards northern Central Italy. Swiss time trial specialist Tony Rominger and Danish rider Rolf Sørensen won the race twice in the 1990s.

Since 2002 the Tirreno–Adriatico is raced over seven stages, starting on Italy's western, Tyrrhenian seashore and finishing in San Benedetto del Tronto on the Adriatic Sea. In 2005 it was included in the inaugural UCI ProTour calendar, but was reclassified in 2008 as a continental tour event when organizer RCS Sport withdrew all its events from the UCI's premier calendar. Since 2011 it is part of the UCI World Tour.

In recent years the race regularly includes mountain stages in the Apennines and many Grand Tours specialists use it as an early-season test towards the stage races later in the year. Tour de France winners Vincenzo Nibali, Cadel Evans and Alberto Contador feature on the roll of honour of the Tirreno since 2010. Colombian climber Nairo Quintana won the 50th edition in 2015 and again in 2017.

The 2020 event was postponed due to the COVID-19 pandemic.

Route

In its early years Tirreno–Adriatico often started close to Rome and even Naples. Since the 1990s the start is usually higher up in seaside resorts on the Tuscan coast of the Tyrrhenian Sea, before crossing the spine of the Italian peninsula to its eastern coast on the Adriatic Sea. Raced over seven days, there are several stages for sprinters, some for climbers, usually one or two time trials and at least one uphill sprint finish for puncheurs.

The route of the 2015 edition is exemplary for the trend to suit stage racers. In recent years the race starts on Wednesday with a short team time trial or prologue and continues with stages for the sprinters and a stage ending in a short hilltop finish. The middle stages – raced over the weekend – are the high mountain stages of the event. In 2015, the Saturday stage ended with a 14 km climb towards the top of Selva Rotonda before the Sunday stage which ended in an uphill finish with slopes of more than 25%. The Tirreno finishes midweek, on Tuesday, in San Benedetto del Tronto in the province of Ascoli Piceno, in the Marche region.

Trophy and leader's jersey
Since 2010, the overall winner of Tirreno–Adriatico is presented with a large gilded trident, the weapon associated with Neptune, the Roman god of the sea. Owing to the event's coast-to-coast format, it is officially named the Sea Master Trophy. In the days preceding the race, the trophy is ceremonially raised from the Tyrrhenian Sea by divers of the Italian Coast Guard. In keeping with the marine theme, the general classification leader's jersey is blue.

List of overall winners

Multiple winners

Wins per country

References

External links

 Official website
 
 Stages 2014

 
UCI World Tour races
UCI ProTour races
Cycle races in Italy
Recurring sporting events established in 1966
1966 establishments in Italy
Super Prestige Pernod races